
Gmina Kowale Oleckie is a rural gmina (administrative district) in Olecko County, Warmian-Masurian Voivodeship, in northern Poland.

Villages
Gmina Kowale Oleckie contains the villages and settlements of Bialskie Pola, Borkowiny, Chełchy, Cicha Wólka, Czerwony Dwór, Czukty, Daniele, Dorsze, Drozdowo, Golubie Wężewskie, Golubki, Gorczyce, Guzy, Jabłonowo, Kiliany, Kowale Oleckie, Lakiele, Monety, Rogówko, Sokółki, Stacze, Stożne, Szarejki, Szeszki, Szwałk, Wężewo, Zawady Oleckie and Żydy.

Neighbouring gminas
Gmina Kowale Oleckie is bordered by the gminas of Banie Mazurskie, Filipów, Gołdap, Kruklanki, Olecko and Świętajno.

References
 Polish official population figures 2006

Kowale Oleckie
Olecko County